is a mountain located in the Tokachi Volcanic Group, Hokkaidō, Japan.

References
 Geographical Survey Institute
 Paul Hunt, Hiking in Japan: An Adventurer's Guide to the Mountain Trails, Tokyo, Kodansha International Ltd., 1988.  and  C0075

Kamihorokamettoku